The 2019 Vissel Kobe season was Vissel Kobe's sixth consecutive season in the J1 League following promotion to the top flight in 2013 and their 21st J1 League season overall. The club also participated in the 2019 Emperor's Cup, the 2019 J.League Cup. Vissel Kobe defeated Kashima Antlers in the final of the Emperor's Cup on 1 January 2020, winning a major trophy for the first time in the club's history.

Squad

Out on loan

Competitions

J. League

Tables

Results summary

Results by round

Emperor's Cup

Knockout stage

Final
The final was played on 1 January 2020 at the newly-rebuilt National Stadium in Tokyo.

J.League Cup

Notes

References

External links
 Vissel Kobe Official Web Site
 J.League official site

Vissel Kobe
Vissel Kobe seasons